Hristo Bristov Iliev (11 May 1936 – 24 March 1974) was a Bulgarian footballer. He played as a forward and spent the majority of his career with Levski Sofia. Iliev also represented Bulgaria at international level in the 1962 World Cup and in the men's tournament at the 1960 Summer Olympics, where Bulgaria did reach the 5th place in the final ranking.

Iliev died in a car crash on 24 March 1974.

Honours

Club 
Levski Sofia
 Bulgarian A Group (2): 1964–65, 1967–68
 Bulgarian Cup (4): 1956, 1957, 1958–59, 1966–67

Individual 
 Bulgarian A Group top scorer (14 goals): 1957

References

External links
Iliev's statistics at levskisofia.info

Bulgarian footballers
Bulgaria international footballers
Association football forwards
PFC Levski Sofia players
Botev Plovdiv players
1962 FIFA World Cup players
1936 births
1974 deaths
First Professional Football League (Bulgaria) players
Road incident deaths in Bulgaria
Footballers from Sofia
Olympic footballers of Bulgaria
Footballers at the 1960 Summer Olympics